This is a list of notable events in country music that took place, or will take place, in 2022.

Events
 January 15 – Jay Barker, husband of Sara Evans, is arrested on domestic violence charges against Evans. At the time of the charge, reports indicate that the couple are separated.
 February 6 – Tyler Hubbard and Brian Kelley of Florida Georgia Line announce they are "taking a break" from recording music together and will be in an indefinite hiatus from touring after several 2022 shows while they pursue solo careers.
 February 19 – Brad Paisley scores his 20th number one on the Billboard Country Airplay chart as featured on Jimmie Allen's "Freedom Was a Highway", tying him with Brooks & Dunn and Toby Keith for the tenth most number ones on that chart since its inception in January 1990.
 March 29 – Eric Church made headlines after cancelling a show at the AT&T Center in order to attend a college basketball game in North Carolina. Church released a statement announcing his intention to watch the Tar Heels vs Blue Devils, longtime rivals who have never faced off in the Final Four of the NCAA tournament, with his family, expressing that it is the most "selfish" thing he has ever done. The decision drew intense criticism from fans who had paid to attend the concert.
 April 7 – Stevie Woodward takes over as lead singer of Runaway June, replacing Naomi Cooke who left two months prior.
 April 10 – Tanya Tucker celebrates the 50th anniversary of her first single, "Delta Dawn", with an all-star concert at the Ryman Auditorium. Guests included Brenda Lee, T. Graham Brown, Delbert McClinton, Paul Overstreet, Jessi Colter, LeAnn Rimes, Ty Herndon and Brandi Carlile.
 April 11 – 
"Drunk (And I Don't Wanna Go Home)" by Elle King and Miranda Lambert reaches number one on the Country Airplay chart, becoming the first female duet to reach the top spot in almost thirty years, following "Does He Love You" by Reba McEntire and Linda Davis in November 1993.
To celebrate their pending induction into the Country Music Hall of Fame, Naomi and Wynonna Judd reunited to perform "Love Can Build a Bridge" at the 2022 CMT Music Awards. Their appearance marked the first time the duo had performed together as The Judds on a televised awards show in more than twenty years. The performance was the duo's last before the death of Naomi on April 30.
April 30 – Garth Brooks performed a concert to more than 102,000 fans at Louisiana State University's Tiger Stadium; movement in the venue registered as a small earthquake when he sang "Callin' Baton Rouge", the unofficial anthem of LSU.
May 19 – Wynonna Judd announces an all-star female lineup of artists to accompany her on The Judds' final tour, in the fall. Brandi Carlile, Faith Hill, Martina McBride, Trisha Yearwood, Little Big Town and Ashley McBryde will fill in for Naomi on select dates, with more artists to be announced at later dates.
 May 20 – John Driskell Hopkins of the Zac Brown Band publicly announces his diagnosis of amyotrophic lateral sclerosis, also known as ALS or Lou Gehrig's disease.
 May 26 – In the aftermath of the Robb Elementary School shooting in Uvalde, Texas, multiple entertainers – including country performers Larry Gatlin, Lee Greenwood and Larry Stewart, along with "American Pie" singer Don McLean – announce they would not be performing at the National Rifle Association's annual convention, which was scheduled the weekend of May 28.
 June 9–12 – After a two-year absence due to the COVID-19 pandemic, the CMA Music Festival returns to Nashville.
 June 12 – Toby Keith announces he had been diagnosed with stomach cancer at the end of the prior year, having undergone chemotherapy, radiation, and surgery for the past six months.
 July 19 – Chapel Hart, a country music group from Mississippi, competes on the television series America's Got Talent and received the Golden Buzzer.
 August 2 – After a decade of touring together, Joanna Cotten announced that she had left Eric Church's band in order to pursue a solo career.
 August 4 – Lady A announce that they are postponing their Request Line Tour to allow member Charles Kelley to focus on his sobriety. 
 August 12 – Singer-songwriter Gretchen Peters revealed her decision to retire from touring and will play her final shows in June 2023, though she will continue to write and record music.
 August 29 –
 Kelsea Ballerini announces that she has filed for divorce from Morgan Evans after nearly five years of marriage.
 Jason Aldean's wife, Brittany, makes an Instagram post which leads to singers such as Maren Morris and Cassadee Pope accusing her of transphobia. In response, Aldean's public relations firm The GreenRoom drops him as a client on September 1.
 September 9 – John Michael Montgomery's tour bus overturns in an accident outside Jellico, Tennessee, injuring Montgomery and several passengers.
 September 11 – Monarch, a country music drama series starring Susan Sarandon, Trace Adkins and Anna Friel, debuts on Fox.
 October 4 – Kentucky Rising, a benefit concert organized by Chris and Morgane Stapleton is held at the Rupp Arena to raise money following devastating flooding that occurred in the state. Other performers included Dwight Yoakam and Tyler Childers alongside surprise appearances from Ricky Skaggs and Patty Loveless, marking a rare live performance following her retirement from live shows in 2009.
 October 11 – Blake Shelton announces he is leaving The Voice after its 23rd season in 2023.
 October 13 – The Mastersons announce that they are leaving Steve Earle's band The Dukes after twelve years.
 October 27 – Dolly Parton announces her retirement from touring.
 October 29 –
 Sam Williams, the grandson of Hank Williams and son of Hank Williams Jr. comes out as gay using the music video of his single "Titled Crown".
 Darius Rucker's version of the Old Crow Medicine Show song "Wagon Wheel" is certified diamond, becoming only the fourth country song (behind "Cruise", "Tennessee Whiskey" and "Old Town Road") to reach this milestone.
 November 3 – Caroline Jones becomes an official member of the Zac Brown Band after serving as their opening act since 2017. Jones is the group's first female member.
 December 30 – "You Proof" by Morgan Wallen spends a tenth week at number one on the Country Airplay chart, thus making it the longest-running number-one single in that chart's history.

Grand Ole Opry
 January 8 – Morgan Wallen's performance with Ernest on the Grand Ole Opry leads to criticism from fans and other country music artists, following the controversy that surrounded Wallen after he was filmed using a racial slur eleven months prior as well as an anti-racism tweet made by the institution.
February 12 – Lauren Alaina is inducted by Trisha Yearwood as the Opry's first member of 2022 following an invite by Yearwood in December 2021. At twenty-seven, Alaina becomes the youngest member of the Opry.
March 19 – After making frequent guest appearances for over seventeen years, Jamey Johnson was invited by Bill Anderson to become an Opry member, with his induction set for May 14.
June 11 – Vince Gill invites Hall of Famers Charlie McCoy and Don Schlitz to become Opry members, the first time in decades that two artists received the invitation during the same show. McCoy was subsequently inducted by Larry Gatlin on July 13 and Schlitz was inducted by Gill and Randy Travis on August 30.
September 17 – Jeannie Seely celebrates her 55th anniversary as an Opry member. Seely has performed on the show over 5000 times, extending her record as the most frequently appearing artist.
October 6 – Garth Brooks surprises Ashley McBryde with an invitation to become the newest Grand Ole Opry member during an interview on CBS Mornings, live from the circle. She was inducted on December 10 by Opry star Terri Clark.

Top hits of the year 
The following songs placed within the Top 20 on the Hot Country Songs, Country Airplay, or Canada Country charts in 2022:

Singles released by American and Australian artists

Singles released by Canadian artists

Top new album releases

Other top albums

Deaths
January 9 – Jerry Ray Johnston, 65, drummer for Bandana (COVID-19)
January 11 – Jerry Crutchfield, 87, American record producer (Anne Murray, Lee Greenwood, Tanya Tucker)
January 14 – Dallas Frazier, 82, American singer-songwriter ("Elvira", "Beneath Still Waters" and "There Goes My Everything")
January 15 – Ralph Emery, 88, American disc jockey and television host (Pop! Goes the Country, Nashville Now)
 January 30 – Hargus "Pig" Robbins, 84, session pianist
February 17 – Dallas Good, 48, member of Canadian band The Sadies.
February 18 – Scotty Wray, former member of The Wrays, brother of Collin Raye, and guitarist for Miranda Lambert.
March 1 – Warner Mack, 86, American country singer-songwriter ("Is It Wrong (For Loving You)", "The Bridge Washed Out").
March 4 – Jimbeau Hinson, 70, American songwriter (stroke)
March 10 – Bobbie Nelson, 91, American pianist and singer; sister of Willie Nelson.
March 11 – Brad Martin, 48, American country singer-songwriter ("Before I Knew Better").
 March 12 – Bruce Burch, 69, songwriter ("It's Your Call", "Rumor Has It")
 March 24 – Randy Cornor, 67, singer-songwriter ("Sometimes I Talk in My Sleep")
 March 26 – Jeff Carson, 58, singer-songwriter ("Not on Your Love", "The Car") (heart attack)
 April 1 – C. W. McCall, 93, singer ("Convoy") (cancer)
 April 1 – Roland White, 83, American bluegrass musician and mandolinist (complications of a heart attack)
 April 25 – Shane Yellowbird, 42, Canadian country singer
 April 30 – Naomi Judd, 76, one-half of The Judds and mother of Wynonna Judd (suicide)
 May 7 – Mickey Gilley, 86, American country singer-songwriter ("Stand By Me", "Room Full of Roses", "Lonely Nights")
 May 23 – Thom Bresh, 74, American singer and guitarist ("Homemade Love") (esophageal cancer)
 May 29 – Ronnie Hawkins, 87, American-Canadian rockabilly singer.
 June 1 – Deborah McCrary, 67, member of Americana/gospel quartet The McCrary Sisters
 June 2 – Hal Bynum, 87, American songwriter ("Lucille"), complications from a stroke and Alzheimer's disease.
 June 10 – Baxter Black, 77, American cowboy poet and veterinarian.
 June 14 – Joel Whitburn, 82, chart historian whose Record Research helped produce books on how songs placed on the Billboard magazine charts, including the Hot Country Songs chart.
 June 23 – Bobby Flores, 61, singer, fiddler and record producer (esophageal cancer).
 July 27 – John Grenell, 78, New Zealand country singer.
 August 8 – Olivia Newton-John, 73, British-Australian country pop singer-songwriter and actress and the only non-American artist to win the CMA Award for Female Vocalist of the Year. (cancer)
 August 26 – Luke Bell, 32,  American country musician and singer-songwriter.
 September 9 – Herschel Sizemore, 87, American bluegrass mandolinist.
 September 21 – Ray Edenton, 95, American guitarist and session musician.
 October 4 – Loretta Lynn, 90, American country singer-songwriter ("Coal Miner's Daughter", "Fist City", "You Ain't Woman Enough (To Take My Man)")
 October 6 – Jody Miller, 80, American country singer ("Queen of the House", "There's a Party Goin' On", "He's So Fine")
 October 11 – Anita Kerr, 94, American singer, composer, arranger and music producer known for developing the Nashville sound.
 October 24 – Don Edwards, 86, cowboy singer-songwriter.
 October 28 – Jerry Lee Lewis, 87, American rock & roll and country singer.
 October 31 – Patrick Haggerty, 77, member of gay country music band Lavender Country (stroke)
 November 7 – Jeff Cook, 73, member of Alabama (Parkinson's disease)
 November 27 – Jake Flint, 37, Red Dirt singer-songwriter.
 December 6 – Peter Cooper, 52, historian, musician and journalist.
 December 15 – Shirley Eikhard, 67, Canadian singer-songwriter ("Something to Talk About")
 December 19 – Charlie Monk, 84, American broadcaster, songwriter, music publisher
 December 29 – Ian Tyson, 89, Canadian singer-songwriter ("Four Strong Winds" and "Someday Soon")
 December 31 – Anita Pointer, 74, member of The Pointer Sisters who had country hits with "Fairytale" and "Two Many Times"

Hall of Fame inductees

Country Music Hall of Fame 
(presented on October 16, 2022)
Joe Galante
Jerry Lee Lewis
Keith Whitley

Canadian Country Music Hall of Fame 
(announced on June 7, 2022)
George Fox
Randall Prescott

International Bluegrass Music Hall of Fame 
(announced on July 26, 2022)
Norman Blake
Paul "Moon" Mullins
Peter Rowan

Nashville Songwriters Hall of Fame 
(presented October 30, 2022)
Hillary Lindsey
David Malloy
Gary Nicholson
Shania Twain
Steve Wariner

Major awards

Academy of Country Music Awards 
(presented on May 11, 2023)

Americana Music Honors & Awards 
(presented on September 14, 2022)

Artist of the Year – Billy Strings
Duo/Group of the Year – The War and Treaty
Album of the Year – Outside Child (Allison Russell)
Song of the Year – "Right on Time" – (Brandi Carlile, Tim Hanseroth, Phil Hanseroth)
Emerging Act of the Year – Sierra Ferrell
Instrumentalist of the Year – Larissa Maestro (cello)
President's Award – Don Williams
Lifetime Achievement Award - Buddy Miller
Free Speech/Inspiration Award – Indigo Girls
Lifetime Achievement Award for Performance – Chris Isaak
Lifetime Achievement Award for Producer/Engineer – Al Bell
Legacy of Americana Award – The Fairfield Four

American Music Awards 
(presented on November 20, 2022)

Favorite Country Album – Red (Taylor's Version) (Taylor Swift)
Favorite Country Song – "Wasted on You" (Morgan Wallen)
Favorite Male Country Artist – Morgan Wallen
Favorite Female Country Artist – Taylor Swift
Favorite Country Duo/Group –  Dan + Shay

ARIA Awards 
(presented on November 24, 2022)
Best Country Album - Light It Up (Casey Barnes)

Billboard Music Awards 
(presented on May 15, 2022)

 Top Country Artist – Taylor Swift
 Top Male Country Artist – Morgan Wallen
 Top Female Country Artist – Taylor Swift
 Top Country Duo/Group – Dan + Shay
 Top Country Album – Red (Taylor's Version) (Taylor Swift)
 Top Country Song – "Fancy Like" (Walker Hayes)
 Top Country Tour – Gather Again Tour (Eric Church)

Canadian Country Music Association Awards 
(presented on September 11, 2022)

Entertainer of the Year - Tenille Townes
Fan Choice - Dallas Smith
Album of the Year - Masquerades (Tenille Townes)
Alternative Country Album of the Year - Songs My Friends Wrote (Corb Lund)
Male Artist of the Year - Dallas Smith
Female Artist of the Year - Tenille Townes
Group or Duo of the Year - The Reklaws
Interactive Artist/Group of the Year - Hailey Benedict
Rising Star - Andrew Hyatt
Single of the Year - "Girl Who Didn't Care" (Tenille Townes)
Songwriter of the Year - "Girl Who Didn't Care" ( Steph Jones, David Pramik, Tenille Townes)
Video of the Year - "High School" (Nice Horse)
Top Selling Canadian Album of the Year - Honkytonk Revival (Jade Eagleson)
Top Selling Canadian Single of the Year - "What the Truck" (The Reklaws and Sacha)
Producer of the Year - Danick Dupelle
Guitar Player of the Year -  Matt McKay
Bass Player of the Year - Brandi Sidoryk
Drummer of the Year - Matthew Atkins
Fiddle Player of the Year - Denis Dufresne
Steel Guitar Player of the Year - Mitch Jay
Keyboard Player of the Year - Brendan Waters
Specialty Instrument Player of the Year - Mitch Jay
Top Selling International Album - Dangerous: The Double Album (Morgan Wallen)

CMT Music Awards 
(presented on April 11, 2022)
Video of the Year – "If I Didn't Love You" (Jason Aldean and Carrie Underwood)
Male Video of the Year – "'Til You Can't" (Cody Johnson)
Female Video of the Year – "If I Was a Cowboy" (Miranda Lambert)
Duo/Group Video of the Year – "Woman You Got" (Maddie & Tae)
Breakthrough Video of the Year – "To Be Loved by You" (Parker McCollum)
Collaborative Video of the Year – "If I Didn't Love You" (Jason Aldean and Carrie Underwood)
CMT Performance of the Year – "Is Anybody Goin' to San Antone" (George Strait from CMT Giants: Charley Pride)
CMT Digital-First Performance of the Year – "Dear Rodeo" (Cody Johnson)
Trending Comeback Song of the Year – "Love Story" (Taylor Swift)

CMT Artists of the Year
 (presented October 14, 2022 in Nashville)
Kane Brown
Luke Combs
Walker Hayes
Carly Pearce
Breakout Artist of the Year: Lainey Wilson
Artist of a Lifetime: Alan Jackson

Country Music Association Awards 
(presented on November 9, 2022)

 Entertainer of the Year –  Luke Combs
 Male Vocalist of the Year – Chris Stapleton
 Female Vocalist of the Year – Lainey Wilson
 Vocal Group of the Year – Old Dominion
 New Artist of the Year – Lainey Wilson
 Vocal Duo of the Year – Brothers Osborne
 Musician of the Year – Jenee Fleenor (fiddle)
 Single of the Year – "'Til You Can't" (Cody Johnson)
 Song of the Year – "Buy Dirt" (Jacob Davis, Jordan Davis, Josh Jenkins, Matt Jenkins)
 Album of the Year – Growin' Up (Luke Combs)
 Musical Event of the Year – "Never Wanted to Be That Girl" (Carly Pearce and Ashley McBryde)
 Video of the Year – "'Til You Can't" (Cody Johnson)
 Willie Nelson Lifetime Achievement Award – Alan Jackson

Grammy Awards 
(presented on February 5, 2023)
 Best Country Solo Performance – "Live Forever" (Willie Nelson)
 Best Country Duo/Group Performance – "Never Wanted to Be That Girl" (Carly Pearce and Ashley McBryde)
 Best Country Song – "'Til You Can't" (Matt Rogers and Ben Stennis)
 Best Country Album – A Beautiful Time (Willie Nelson)
 Best Bluegrass Album – Crooked Tree (Molly Tuttle & Golden Highway)
 Best Americana Album – In These Silent Days (Brandi Carlile)
 Best American Roots Performance – "Stompin' Ground" (Aaron Neville with Dirty Dozen Brass Band)
 Best Americana Performance – "Made Up Mind" (Bonnie Raitt)
 Best American Roots Song – "Just Like That" (Bonnie Raitt)
 Best Roots Gospel Album – The Urban Hymnal (Tennessee State University Marching Band)

International Bluegrass Music Awards 
(presented on September 30, 2022)

Entertainer of the Year – Billy Strings
Male Vocalist of the Year – Del McCoury
Female Vocalist of the Year – Molly Tuttle
Vocal Group of the Year – Doyle Lawson and Quicksilver 
Instrumental Group of the Year – Béla Fleck's My Bluegrass Heart
New Artist of the Year – Rick Faris
Album of the Year – My Bluegrass Heart (Béla Fleck)
Song of the Year – "Red Daisy" (Billy Strings, Jarrod Walker, Christian Ward)
Gospel Recording of the Year – "In the Sweet By-and-By" (Dolly Parton with Carl Jackson, Larry Cordle, Bradley Walker and Jerry Salley)
Instrumental Recording of the Year – "Vertigo" (Béla Fleck featuring Sam Bush, Stuart Duncan, Edgar Meyer and Bryan Sutton)
Collaborative Recording of the Year – "In the Sweet By-and-By" (Dolly Parton with Carl Jackson, Larry Cordle, Bradley Walker and Jerry Salley)
Guitar Player of the Year – Cody Kilby
Banjo Player of the Year – Béla Fleck
Fiddle Player of the Year – Bronwyn Keith-Hynes
Mandolin Player of the Year – Sierra Hull
Bass Player of the Year – Jason Moore
Resophonic Guitar Player of the Year – Justin Moses

Juno Awards 
(presented on March 13, 2023)
Country Album of the Year - Masquerades (Tenille Townes)

References 

Country
Country music by year
Culture-related timelines by year